Wardeh may refer to:
Vardeh (disambiguation), places in Iran
Nima Abu-Wardeh, BBC World News presenter
Salim Wardeh (b. 1968), Lebanese politician